Even Sapir (lit. Sapphire)  is a moshav in central Israel. Located on the outskirts of Jerusalem, it falls under the jurisdiction of Mateh Yehuda Regional Council.

History
Even Sapir was established in 1949 on land that had belonged to the depopulated Palestinian village of 'Ayn Karim.

The moshav was founded by Hebrew repatriants returning from Kurdistan. The name was either taken from Even Sapir, a book written in 1864 by Yaakov Halevi Sapir, a Jerusalem rabbi and emissary, which describes his travels to Yemen in the 19th century, or it was named after Pinchas Sapir, Israel's finance minister, who encouraged Jewish businessmen from the Diaspora to invest in Palestine and the nascent state.

To the north of the moshav is the Monastery of St. John in the Wilderness and a cave attributed to John the Baptist.

Even Sapir is one end point of the Jerusalem Trail, a 42-kilometer walking route around and through Jerusalem, which intersects with the Israel National Trail. The point of intersection is just outside Even Sapir at the Ein Hindak spring.

Even Sapir is a home to "Ben Gurion Institute of Science & Technology", Jerusalem Campus, a housing estate designated for 430 local and international students.

References

Kurdish-Jewish culture in Israel
Moshavim
Populated places established in 1950
Populated places in Jerusalem District
1950 establishments in Israel